Ved Rattan Mohan was an Indian entrepreneur and the creator of Old Monk, an iconic vatted Indian dark rum. Born to Narendra Nath Mohan, the founder of Mohan Meakin, he took over the company in 1969 after the death of his father. During his tenure as the managing director, the company expanded to add three distilleries and two breweries and added new lines of business such as breakfast food and juices, glass manufacturing, vinegars, and cold storage. He also introduced, Solan No. 1 and Golden Eagle, two popular liquor brands, besides Old Monk. He was the mayor of Lucknow for two terms and served as a member of Rajya Sabha. The Government of India awarded him the Padma Shri, the fourth highest civilian award, in 1967. He received the Padma Bhushan, the third highest civilian award, in 1971.

Mohan died in 1970, at the age of 45. Rocky Mohan, who is no longer associated with Mohan Meakin, was his son and former managing director of the company, Kapil Mohan, was his brother.

References

External links
 

Recipients of the Padma Bhushan in trade and industry
Recipients of the Padma Shri in trade and industry
Year of birth missing
1973 deaths
Mayors of Lucknow
Rajya Sabha members from Uttar Pradesh
People from Ghaziabad, Uttar Pradesh
Indian industrialists
Liquor portal